The Deep Lens Survey (DLS, short for "Deep Gravitational Lensing Survey") is an ultra-deep multi-band optical survey of seven 4 square degree fields. Mosaic CCD imagers at the National Optical Astronomy Observatory's Blanco (Cerro Tololo) and Mayall telescopes (Kitt Peak) are being used. The deep fields took five years to complete (2001–2006), in four bands: B, V, R, and z', to 29/29/29/28 mag per square arcsecond surface brightness. Optical transient events (including moving objects such as minor planets and comets) and supernova candidates are released in real time.

Survey 

The main goal of the survey is to produce unbiased maps of the large-scale structure of the mass distribution beyond the local universe, via very deep multicolor imaging of seven 2-degree fields and colour-redshifts. The shear of distant galaxies induced by the mass of foreground structures will be measured. These weak-lensing observations are sensitive to all forms of clumped mass and will yield unbiased mass maps with resolution of one arcmin in the plane of the sky (about 120 kpc/h at z = 0.2), in multiple redshift ranges. These maps will measure for the first time the change in large scale structure from z = 1 to the present epoch, and test the current theories of structure formation, which predict that mass in the low-redshift universe has a particular filamentary/sheetlike structure. These observations will directly constrain the clustering properties of matter, and, when compared with the results from microwave background anisotropy missions, will test the basic theory of structure formation via gravitational instability.

While this is the main goal of the survey, a wide-field imaging survey has a myriad of other uses. In addition, the group is acquiring the data in a way which makes it possible to detect variable objects on scales of hours to months, by spreading observations of individual subfields over 4 runs over two years.

Discoveries

List of discovered minor planets

Galaxy clusters

References

External links 
 Home page

Astronomical surveys
Asteroid surveys

Minor-planet discovering observatories
Gravitational lensing